The professional world rankings for all snooker players on the main tour in the 2006–07 season are listed below. The total points from the 2004–05 and 2005–06 seasons were used to determine the rankings.

Rankings

Notes

For this season,
Stephen Hendry, despite having not had the best of seasons, regains the number one spot after nine years from second place.
Paul Hunter drops out of the top 32, down from number five to number 34 in the points list at the end of the 2005–06 season, shortly before his death.
Jimmy White drops out of the top 32 after his worst season to date, down from 8 to 34.
Alan McManus drops out of the top 16 after ten seasons, down from 12 to 19.
Ian McCulloch drops out of the top 16 after one season, down from 16 to 25.
Anthony Hamilton re-enters the top 16 after gaining one place, from 17 to 16.
Barry Pinches drops out of the top 32, down from 18 to 33.
Ali Carter reaches the top 16 for the first time in his career, rising from 19th to 15th.
Neil Robertson enters the top 16, from number 27 to number 13.
John Parrott drops out of the top 32, down from 28 to 42.
Ryan Day officially enters the top 32, from 33 (just outside the top 32, although he replaced the suspended Quinten Hann, officially in 22nd place at the time, during most of the season) to 17.
Stuart Bingham and Ding Junhui enter the top 32, from 37th to  24th and 62nd to 27th respectively.
Mark Selby and Joe Swail re-enter the top 32, from 38th to 28th and 40th to 30th respectively.

References

2006
Rankings 2006
Rankings 2007